This article contains information about the literary events and publications of 1506.

Events
unknown date – Italian poet Ludovico Ariosto begins writing Orlando Furioso (earliest version published in 1516; first complete version published 1532).

New books

Poetry

Publio Fausto Andrelini – Eclogues
William Dunbar – 
Stephen Hawes – The Passtyme of Pleasure
Niccolò Machiavelli – The First Decade (Decennale primo)

Births
February 1 (approximate – George Buchanan, Scottish humanist historian, scholar and poet (died 1582)
August 12 – Franciscus Sonnius, Dutch counter-Reformation theologian (died 1576)
October – Louis de Blois, Flemish mystical writer (died 1566)
December 8 – Veit Dietrich, German theologian, writer and reformer (died 1549)
Unknown dates
Abderrahman El Majdoub, North African poet, Sufi and mystic 
Michael Helding (Sidonius), Roman Catholic bishop, scholar, writer and humanist (died 1561)
probable
Richard Grafton, English chronicler and King's Printer (died 1573)
Hwang Jini, Korean woman kisaeng and poet (died c. 1560)

Deaths
February 16 – Jakub of Gostynin, Polish philosopher (born c.1454)
May 2 – Johannes von Soest, German composer, theorist and poet (born 1448)
unknown date – Mihri Hatun, Ottoman Anatolian female poet

References

1506

1506 books
Years of the 16th century in literature